Vlada Ihorivna Nikolchenko (born 9 December 2002) is a retired Ukrainian individual rhythmic gymnast. She is the 2019 Worlds clubs bronze medalist, the double (2018-19) World Cup Series winner with clubs and the Grand Prix Final 2018 Winner. She has won multiple medals at European Championships and European Games.

Career

Junior
Before beginning rhythmic gymnastics, Nikolchenko participated in Aesthetic Group Gymnastics. She was part of the junior Ukrainian group at the 2017 European Championships, where they finished 8th in the 10 clubs final. Nikolchenko also participated as an individual at the International Tournament in Eilat, Israel and won it.

Senior

2018 
Nikolchenko commenced her 2018 senior season at the LA Lights International Tournament in Los Angeles. She also competed at the Miss Valentine Tournament in Tartu, Estonia, where she won the all-around, hoop, ball and clubs finals and finished 4th in ribbon.

Nikolchenko participated at the Baltic Hoop Tournament and won the all-around and clubs final, as well as a bronze in hoop. She finished 7th in the ribbon and 8th in the ball final.

Her Grand Prix debut took place in Kyiv, where she finished 10th in the AA final, 5th in the clubs final and 8th in ribbon and ball. At the 2018 Grand Prix Thiais, she placed 9th in the all-around, won a gold in hoop ahead of Russians Arina Averina and Ekaterina Selezneva and placed 7th in clubs.

Nikolchenko’s first World Cup event was the 2018 Sofia World Cup, where she finished 7th in the AA and qualified to the ribbon and clubs final. In Sofia, she won her first World Cup medal, a silver in clubs, and finished 8th in ribbon. At the 2018 Pesaro World Cup, Nikolchenko placed 13th in the all-around final, won the silver medal for clubs and placed 8th in the ball final. At the 2018 Tashkent World  Cup, she placed 10th in AA, 5th in ribbon and 8th in clubs. Nikolchenko’s final 2018 World Cup event was the Baku World Cup, where she won silver in the all-around, gold with clubs and bronze with ribbon. She also placed 5th in hoop and 6th in ball.
Nikolchenko was the 2018 World Cup Series winner for clubs.

Nikolchenko made her World Cup Challenge debut at the 2018 Guadalajara World Challenge Cup, where she finished 5th in the all-around, 4th in hoop and 4th in ribbon. She also took part in the Holon Grand Prix, where she also placed 5th in all-around and won the silver medal for hoop and clubs. At the 2018 European Championships, Nikolchenko finished 11th. At the 2018 Minsk World Challenge Cup, she placed 5th in the all-around and qualified to three finals. She won bronze with hoop, finished 4th in ribbon and 6th in ball. At the 2018 Rhythmic Gymnastics World Championships, she placed 5th in the clubs final, 7th in ribbon, 8th in hoop and 4th in the all-around. Her team finished 5th for the team competition. Nikolchenko finished her 2018 season at the Grand Prix Final in Marbella, where she won the all-around gold. She also won gold in clubs, gold in ribbon and silver in ball.

2019 
Her 2019 season commenced at the LA Lights Tournament, where she finished 2nd in all-around behind Alina Harnasko.

At the Grand Prix in Marbella, Nikolchenko finished 4th in the all-around, 3rd in hoop, 6th in ribbon, 7th in clubs and 8th in ball. At the Grand Prix Kyiv, she won the all-around gold, hoop gold, ball silver and ribbon bronze. Nikolchenko took part at the Thiais Grand Prix, placing 7th in all-around, 5th in clubs and 8th in ball. She also won the bronze in hoop. Her first World Cup event of the season was the 2019 Sofia World Cup, where she placed 5th in all-around, 6th in clubs and 8th in ribbon.

Nikolchenko participated at the 2019 Tashkent World Cup, finishing 6th in the all-around after several mistakes in her ball routine. She won bronze for hoop and clubs, and took 6th place in ribbon. The following week, she took part in the Baku World Cup and took the all-around bronze behind Russian twins Arina Averina and Dina Averina. She won bronze for clubs and placed 4th in ribbon, 5th in hoop and 7th in ball. Like in 2018, Nikolchenko was the World Cup winner for clubs ; she was also the World Cup winner for clubs for the second year in a row.

At the Ukrainian National Championships, Nikolchenko won gold in the all-around. At the European Championships in Baku, she qualified for the hoop and clubs final, winning a quota place for the following year’s European Championship in Kyiv. She won bronze in clubs and finished 8th for hoop.

Nikolchenko participated at the Grand Prix Holon, finishing 11th in the all-around. She only qualified to one final for hoop, where she won silver. At the 2019 Cluj Napoca World Challenge Cup, Nikolchenko brought two new routines for ball and ribbon. She finished 4th in the all-around and qualified for the hoop, ball and clubs finals. She won gold in clubs and finished 5th for hoop and ball.

At the 2019 Rhythmic Gymnastics World Championships in Baku, she qualified for the ball, clubs and ribbon final. Nikolchenko won a bronze with clubs, her first world championship medal, and placed 4th for ribbon and ball. She finished 5th at the all-around final, her second year placed in the top five. Nikolchenko succeeded in winning an Olympic quota.

2020-2021 
At the 2020 European Championships in Kyiv, Nikolchenko finished eighth in the all-around. She won gold in clubs at the 2020 Grand Prix Final in Kyiv. At the 2021 European Championships in Varna, she finished 13th in the all-around. In July 2021, she announced through her Instagram account that she was taking a break from gymnastics and would not attend the Olympic Games due to health issues after contracting COVID-19.

Routine music information

References

External links 

 Profile from FIG
 
  "The Price of Victory" – profile from UATV on YouTube

Living people
2002 births
Sportspeople from Kharkiv
Ukrainian rhythmic gymnasts
Gymnasts at the 2019 European Games
European Games medalists in gymnastics
European Games bronze medalists for Ukraine
Medalists at the Rhythmic Gymnastics European Championships
Medalists at the Rhythmic Gymnastics World Championships
21st-century Ukrainian women